Tremulina is a genus of flowering plants belonging to the family Restionaceae. The genus was first described in 1998 by Barbara Briggs & Lawrie Johnson. The type species is Tremulina tremula.

Its native range is Southwestern Australia.

Species:
 Tremulina cracens B.G.Briggs & L.A.S.Johnson 
 Tremulina tremula (R.Br.) B.G.Briggs & L.A.S.Johnson

References

Restionaceae
Poales genera